Robert Hooker may refer to:

Robert Hooker (soccer), soccer player
Robert Hooker (MP), English MP and mayor